Berço Sport Clube is a Portuguese sports club from Guimarães.

The men's football team plays in the Campeonato de Portugal, the fourth tier of Portuguese football. The team started out in the AF Braga Honra Série B in 2017–18, but was promoted to the third tier by 2019. In 2021, the Campeonato de Portugal dropped from being the third to the fourth tier.

References

Football clubs in Portugal
Association football clubs established in 2016
2016 establishments in Portugal
Sport in Guimarães